or  is a lake that lies in the municipality of Sørfold in Nordland county, Norway. The lake Rundvatnet lies immediately east of Sisovatnet.

The lake is fed by the melting snow from the large Blåmannsisen glacier to the southeast.  Water naturally flows out of Sisovatnet to the lake Andkjelvatnet, although much of the water is diverted to the lake Straumvatnet to be used for hydroelectric power.

See also
 List of lakes in Norway
 Geography of Norway

References

Sørfold
Lakes of Nordland